Margaret Furse (born Alice Margaret Watts, 18 February 1911 – 8 July 1974) was an English costume designer.

Personal life
She was born to Punch magazine illustrator Arthur G. Watts and his wife, Phyllis Gordon Watts. She married art director Roger K. Furse on 4 December 1936 at Chelsea Old Church.

Career
She trained at the Central School of Arts and Crafts (now the Central School of Art and Design) and then joined Motley Theatre Design Group.
She became a costume designer in films, her first film was Laurence Olivier's Henry V as assistant designer to Roger Kemble Furse.
She had her own costumier business called New Sheridan House.
In 1970, she was awarded an Academy Award for Best Costume Design for Anne of the Thousand Days (1969) and had five other nominations for The Mudlark (1951), Becket (1964), The Lion in Winter (1968), Scrooge (1970) and Mary, Queen of Scots (1971).
She was also posthumously awarded an Emmy in 1975 for Outstanding Achievement in Costume Design for "Love Among the Ruins" (ABC Theatre, 6 March 1975) (her only nomination).

Later years
Roger and Margaret Furse divorced in 1953. She remarried and remained with her second husband, the Scottish author, film and drama critic Stephen G. Watts (no relation to her parents), until her death from breast cancer on 8 July 1974, in Kensington, London.

A portrait is in the permanent collection of London's National Portrait Gallery.   She was also painted by Gluck.

Accolades

Academy Awards

BAFTAs

References

External links
 
 Biodata

1911 births
1974 deaths
Best Costume Design Academy Award winners
Best Costume Design BAFTA Award winners
Deaths from cancer in England
Deaths from breast cancer
English costume designers
People from Kensington
Place of birth missing